The R377 road is a regional road in north County Roscommon in Ireland. It connects the R367 road at Castleplunket to the N60 road at Castlerea.

The government legislation that defines the R377, the Roads Act 1993 (Classification of Regional Roads) Order 2012 (Statutory Instrument 54 of 2012), provides the following official description:

R377: Castleplunket — Castlerea, County Roscommon

Between its junction with R367 at Castleplunket and its junction with N60 at Saint Patrick Street Castlerea via Lissalway, Ballinphuill, Knockmurry; and Main Street at Castlerea all in the county of Roscommon.

See also
National primary road
National secondary road
Regional road
Roads in Ireland

References

Regional roads in the Republic of Ireland
Roads in County Roscommon